The TVR Tuscan Speed Six is a sports car which was manufactured by British automobile manufacturer TVR from 1999 to 2006. The name pays homage to the original Tuscan which was introduced in 1967.

History

The Tuscan Speed Six was introduced in 1999 and was available for media demonstration in 2000. The reason being then owner Peter Wheeler imposing a ban on press reviews of the car. Later, a Red Rose pack option raised the power output to  bringing with it track focus chassis upgrades as well as an AP Racing braking system.

The Tuscan Speed Six underwent a facelift in 2005 and was now called the Tuscan 2. Exterior changes featured a redesigned front grille and headlamps along with more conventional taillamps. Mechanical changes involved revised spring rates, improved steering response and different suspension geometry to make the car easier to drive on public roads. The interior was also refreshed and featured a more conventional and ergonomic layout. Production lasted until the closure of TVR in 2006.

Specifications

Engine
Five different inline-six engine options were offered to customers. Four of these were variants of the naturally aspirated 4.0 L Speed Six fuel fed by multipoint fuel injection making different amounts of power and torque, depending on the trim level selected. The last was a 3.6 L Speed Six which produced the same amount of power as the lowest-level 4.0 L engine, although slightly less torque.

 Bore x stroke:
  ;
  
 Power and torque:
 3.6L Mk1: , 
 4.0L Mk1: , 
 4.0L Mk1 Red Rose: , 
 4.0L Mk1 S (pre-2003):  at 7,000 rpm  at 5,250 rpm
 4.0L Mk1 S (post-2003): , 
 4.0L Mk2 (post-2005): , 
 4.0L Mk2 S (post-2005): , 
 4.0L Mk2 Convertible (post-2005): , 
 4.0L Mk2 Convertible Red Rose (post-2005): , 
 4.2L Mk2 T440R (2003):  at 7,600 rpm,  at 6,000 rpm.

Chassis

Even though there have been numerous tweaks to the Tuscan's chassis and suspension, the overall size and appearance of the variants remain virtually identical apart from minor aerodynamic aids to the S model in the form of an undertray in the front and a small boot-lid spoiler on the rear.

In October 2005 the "Mk 2" version of the Tuscan was introduced, though in reality this was just a minor facelift. The modifications were restricted to cosmetic changes to the front and rear lights, the dashboard, and the spoilers on the S model plus some minor changes to the chassis to improve the handling. At the same time, a new variant a full soft top was introduced alongside the original targa version.

Performance
 0–30 mph (48 km/h): 1.72 s
 0–60 mph (97 km/h): 3.68 s
 0–100 mph (161 km/h): 8.08 s
 100–0 mph: 4.15 s

These test results were achieved in a post-2003 Tuscan S without traction-control or anti-lock brakes. TVR's design philosophy holds that such features do not improve either the performance or safety of their vehicles and thus they are not so equipped.  TVR rejects the notion that these features, along with airbags, are "safety devices" and believes that, based on testing and experience, their cars are safer without these things than with them.

A modified version of the car was used in the 2003 24 Hours of Le Mans, and again the following year.

References

External links
Official TVR website

Tuscan
Sports cars
Rear-wheel-drive vehicles
Coupés
Cars introduced in 1999
2000s cars
24 Hours of Le Mans race cars